Anne Cairns (born 11 January 1981) is a New Zealand-Samoan canoeist, who represented Samoa at the 2016 Summer Olympics, and 2020 Summer Olympics.

Personal life
Cairns lives in Palmerston North, where she attended Palmerston North Girls' High School, and is a firefighter.

Canoeing career
Cairns originally represented New Zealand, and attempted to qualify for the 2008 Summer Olympics in the K1 and K4 boats.

Cairns competed in the K1 200 and 500 metre races at the 2016 Summer Olympics, finishing last in both of her heats.

She competed at the 2020 Summer Olympics, in Women's K-1 200 m, and Women's K-1 500 m.

References

External links
 

1981 births
Living people
New Zealand sportspeople of Samoan descent
Olympic canoeists of Samoa
Samoan female canoeists
New Zealand female canoeists
Firefighters
People educated at Palmerston North Girls' High School
Sportspeople from Dannevirke
Canoeists at the 2016 Summer Olympics
Canoeists at the 2020 Summer Olympics